McCluer South-Berkeley High School is a grade 9-12 secondary school located at 201 Brotherton Lane in the city of Ferguson, Missouri. a suburb of St. Louis. Located in the Ferguson-Florissant School District (FFSD), McCluer South Berkeley is the newest secondary school.

History
The school opened in January 2004, replacing Berkeley High School in Berkeley, which had closed in December 2003 due to expansion of the Lambert-St. Louis International Airport.

When it was a zoned school, MSB educated students from the cities of Cool Valley, Ferguson, Kinloch and Berkeley.

As of October 10, 2018 The Board Of Education has decided to convert MSB into a STEAM school. It was decided by a 4 to 2 vote, with different ethnic group board members making different votes. Since 2019 it is now known as STEAM Academy at McCluer South-Berkeley High, following the STEAM Academy Middle School created in 2017.

References

External links

 STEAM Academy at McCluer South-Berkeley High
 McCluer South-Berkeley High School

High schools in St. Louis County, Missouri
Public high schools in Missouri
Educational institutions established in 2004
2004 establishments in Missouri